Ikonnikovia is a genus in the family Plumbaginaceae, containing only the species Ikonnikovia kaufmannia, found in Central Asia.

References

Plumbaginaceae
Monotypic Caryophyllales genera